The Gregor GR-1, also called the GR-1 Continental and the GR-1 Sportplane was a biplane with a tail-wheel undercarriage developed by Michael Gregor

Development
The Gregor GR-1 was intended to be a light, low cost, training aircraft for depression-era customers. Gregor was based at Hangar B at Roosevelt Field in New York. The aircraft was a conventional geared biplane with two open cockpits in tandem with oversize interplane struts.

Variants
Gregor GR-2

Specifications (GR-1)

References

Biplanes